George Carmichael "Tot" Robinson (1876–1940) was a rugby union international who represented England from 1897 to 1901. After retiring from playing rugby he became a sports administrator and rugby selector, eventually serving as president for the Rugby Football Union.

Personal life
Robinson was born on 1876 in Gateshead. He was educate at Dame Allan's School, Newcastle. He was a Justice of the Peace from 1932 to 1940.

Rugby union career
Robison first came to note as a rugby player when he represented club side Gosforth Rugby Football Club but by 1897 he was representing Percy Park RFC. He was the first player to be directly capped for England from Percy Park, and the first international from Northumberland, but was followed by several more in the next six years. 
Robinson made his international debut on 6 February 1897 at Lansdowne Road in the Ireland vs England match. Of the eight matches he played for his national side he was on the winning side on 2 occasions. Despite this low winning return, Robinson had an incredibly high try scoring rate with eight tries over his eight caps. He played his final match for England on 9 March 1901 at Rectory Field, Blackheath in the England vs Scotland match.

As well as his two Northern clubs, Robinson also turned out for London's Blackheath F.C. and was also invited to tour with the Barbarians. He played three times for the Barbarians between 1896 and 1897 scoring tries in two of his matches. Robinson was also selected to play at county level and turned out for Northumberland. Aftering retiring from playing the sport, he continued his connection with rugby by becoming a member of the Northumberland region of the Rugby Football Union (RFU), the governing body for rugby union in England. From 1921 to 1929 he was a selector of the English team and in 1939 he was given the honour of serving for the traditional year's term as president of the RFU.

International try record
Source for below: espnscrum.com match record for Tot Robinson

References

1876 births
1940 deaths
English rugby union players
England international rugby union players
Rugby union wings
Barbarian F.C. players
Blackheath F.C. players
Rugby union officials
Rugby union players from Gateshead